Howard School may refer to numerous institutions:

United States

 Howard School (Brownsburg, Indiana), listed on the NRHP in Boone County, Indiana
 Howard School (Warrensburg, Missouri), NRHP-listed
 Howard School (Forsyth, Montana), NRHP-listed
 Howard School (Atlanta), Georgia
 Howard Junior High School, Prosperity, South Carolina, listed on the NRHP in Newberry County, South Carolina
 Howard School of Academics and Technology, Chattanooga, Tennessee

United Kingdom
 The Howard School, Kent

See also
 Howard High School (disambiguation)
 Howard University, a federally chartered, private, coeducational, nonsectarian, historically black university in Washington, D.C., USA